Chicago Ridge Mall, formerly Westfield Chicago Ridge from 2004-2012, is a shopping mall in Chicago Ridge, Illinois. The mall includes one anchor store (Kohl's), as well as Bed Bath & Beyond, Michaels arts and crafts store, AMC Theatres, and a food court. It was built in 1981 and expanded in 1986. In April 2012, Westfield sold the mall to Starwood Capital Group, with JLL responsible for management.

History
The Chicago Ridge Mall began construction in 1980 as a $50 billion project at the site of the former Starlite Drive-In Theatre which closed in 1979 after a 31-year run. The entire mall opened in 1981. The Lenhdorff Group bought the mall in 1986 and sold it to JMB Realty a year later.

In July 1981, Essaness Theatres opened its triplex cinema at the mall, which later became a six-screen theater. The theatre throughout the years went into the chains of Cineplex Odeon, then Loews, and finally AMC. In 1993, Montgomery Ward was added as an anchor in a spot previously occupied by Madigan's. The Montgomery Ward space later became Bed Bath & Beyond and Steve & Barry's, the latter of which closed in 2008. In 2010, Westfield Group confirmed that Aldi would open in 2011 in the space vacated by Steve and Barry's. In August 2015, a two-story H&M was added to the mall. Red Robin opened on November 21, 2016.

On April 18, 2018, it was announced that Carson's would be closing as parent company The Bon-Ton Stores was going out of business. The store closed on August 29, 2018.

On June 17, 2020, plans were announced for Dick's Sporting Goods to open in the lower level of the former Carson's space. The store opened on August 6, 2021.

On February 12, 2021, it was announced that Sears would also be closing as part of a plan to close 32 stores nationwide. The store closed on May 2, 2021.

On July 23, 2021, it was announced that the Disney Store would be closing as part of a plan to close at least 60 stores nationwide. The store closed on August 18th, 2021. It was the last location with the original 1990's "pink and green" design. 

On January 31, 2023, it was announced that Bed Bath & Beyond would close as part of a plan to close 87 stores nationwide, which will leave Kohl's, Michaels, and AMC Theatres as the only anchors left.

Bus routes 
Pace

  381 95th Street  
  384 Narragansett/Ridgeland  
  395 95th/Dan Ryan CTA/UPS Hodgkins (Weekday UPS shifts only)

References

External links

Shopping malls established in 1981
Shopping malls in Cook County, Illinois
1981 establishments in Illinois